William Alan Kelso Freyer (11 March 1900 – 4 December 1961) was  a former Australian rules footballer who played with South Melbourne and Footscray in the Victorian Football League (VFL).

Notes

External links 
		

1900 births
1961 deaths
Australian rules footballers from Melbourne
Sydney Swans players
Western Bulldogs players
People from Port Melbourne